The Rajiv Gandhi National Institute of Youth Development (RGNIYD), Regional Centre, Chandigarh (Hindi: राजीव गांधी राष्ट्रीय युवा विकास संस्थान, क्षेत्रीय कार्यालय, चंडीगढ़, Punjabi: ਰਾਜੀਵ ਗਾਂਧੀ ਰਾਸ਼ਟਰੀ ਨੌਜਵਾਨ ਵਿਕਾਸ ਸੰਸਥਾ, ਖੇਤਰੀ ਦਫ਼ਤਰ, ਚੰਡੀਗੜ੍ਹ) was established in 2014 in city of Chandigarh. The Regional Centre is part of its parent institution Rajiv Gandhi National Institute of Youth Development located at Sriperumbudur, Tamil Nadu, India, which is an Institute of National Importance by an Act of Parliament no. 35/2012 under the Ministry of Youth Affairs & Sports, Government of India and a Deemed University declared under Section 3 of the UGC Act, 1956.

Campus 

The Regional Centre campus is on a campus of 11 acres of Sector 12 in the city of Chandigarh. The campus is adjacent to a medical institution known as the Postgraduate Institute of Medical Education and Research.

Key functions 
RGNIYD, Regional Centre, Chandigarh offers inter-disciplinary, multi-dimensional, field-based expertise in the following areas through training, workshops and consultancy:
 Formulation of Youth Policies and Programmes
 Training of Trainers/Capacity Building
 Preparation of Core Training Material and Facilitators’ Manuals
 Enhancing Employability Skills of Youth
 Implementing Skill Development Programmes
 Monitoring and Evaluation Studies
 Client-based and Demand-driven Training Programmes
 Academic Programmes in Youth Work
 Organizing Seminars on Youth Work
 Study and Exposure Visits
 Professional Development Programmes for Government official and International organizations

Skill development programmes 

RGNIYD, Regional Centre, Chandigarh runs demand-driven and job-oriented skill development programmes through its state-of-the-art Information Technology Lab and computer equipped bus under the aegis of Ministry of Youth Affairs and Sports, Government of India and with the support of State Urban Poverty Alleviation Cell (Municipal Corporation Chandigarh) to empower them for the access of employment opportunities.

The Skill Development Programme has benefited more than 700 poor youth through computer education and personality sevelopment for eight months and is provided with toolkits which includes bags, T-shirts and books.

References 

Organisations based in Chandigarh
Youth development organizations
Educational organisations based in India
2014 establishments in Chandigarh